LEDS may refer to:

 LEDs, light-emitting diodes
 Low-Emission Development Strategies and Plans, an advanced climate-resilient low emission development strategy
 Life Events and Difficulties Schedule, a psychological measurement of the stressfulness of life events created by psychologists George Brown and Tirril Harris in 1978

See also 
Leeds, a city in West Yorkshire, England